Brent's Delicatessen & Restaurant is a Jewish deli and restaurant located in Northridge, California. The restaurant was opened in 1967 and purchased by Ron Peskin in 1969 for $1700. The deli has expanded to a second location in Westlake Village, California.

Ratings
Brent's Deli has been highly rated by food critics.  The deli is known for producing most of their own food in-house and has been described as "unheralded but authentic".

On The Best Thing I Ever Ate, Marc Summers says the best corned beef sandwich was at Brent's.

See also

 List of delicatessens

References

External links
 

1967 establishments in California
Ashkenazi Jewish cuisine
Ashkenazi Jewish culture in Los Angeles
Jewish delicatessens in the United States
Northridge, Los Angeles
Restaurants established in 1967
Restaurants in California
Ashkenazi Jewish restaurants